Debbie White may refer to:
 Debbie White (netball player) (born 1978), New Zealand netball player
 Debbie White (businesswoman) (born 1962), British businesswoman
 Debbie White (bowls), New Zealand international lawn bowler